{{Infobox road
| country     = DEU
| type        = B
| route       = 14
| map         = B014 Verlauf.svg
| map_notes   = 
| length_km   = 464
| direction_a = West
| terminus_a  = 
| direction_b = East
| terminus_b  = 
| states      = Baden-Württemberg, Bavaria
| junction    = {{BS-map|collapsible=1|collapse=1|inlinestyle=1|title=Route Map|map=
!colspan="3" align=left
Baden-Württemberg
-
!colspan="3" align=left
Konstanz district (KN number plates)
 

-
!colspan="3" align=left
Tuttlingen district (TUT number plates)

 948 m

 

 

-
!colspan="3" align=left
Rottweil district (RW number plates)

 

-
!colspan="3" align=left
diversion around Rottweil together with the 

 

 
 
-
!colspan="3" align=left
diversion around Rottweil together with the 

-
!colspan="3" align=left
under 

 

 

-
!colspan="3" align=left
Freudenstadt district (FDS number plates)

 

 
continues as 

-
!colspan="3" align=left
replaced by 
-
!colspan="3" align=left
replaced by 
-
!colspan="3" align=left
replaced by 

-
!colspan="3" align=left
Böblingen district (BB number plates)
 

 

-
!colspan="3" align=left
replaced by 

-
!colspan="3" align=left
Stuttgart (S number plates)

continuation of 

 220 m

 291 m
 306 m

 2300 m

 

 

-
!colspan="3" align=left
together with the  through Stuttgart

 280 m

-
!colspan="3" align=left
together with the  through Stuttgart

-
!colspan="3" align=left
Rems-Murr-Kreis (WN number plates)
 1585 m

 
 

 1008 m

-
!colspan="3" align=left
Schwäbisch Hall district (SHA number plates)
 
 

 

-
!colspan="3" align=left

-
!colspan="3" align=left

 
 

-
!colspan="3" align=left
replaced by  

-
!colspan="3" align=left
Bavaria
-
!colspan="3" align=left
Ansbach district (AN number plates)
 

 

-
!colspan="3" align=left
Fürth district (FÜ number plates)

-
!colspan="3" align=left
Nürnberg (N number plates)

 

-
!colspan="3" align=left
replaced by 
-
!colspan="3" align=left
connecting to 

-
!colspan="3" align=left

-
!colspan="3" align=left
Nürnberger Land district (LAU number plates)
 

 

-
!colspan="3" align=left
replaced by 

-
!colspan="3" align=left
 

-
!colspan="3" align=left
Amberg-Sulzbach district (AS number plates)
 

 

-
!colspan="3" align=left
Schwandorf district (SAD number plates)
 

-
!colspan="3" align=left
Neustadt an der Waldnaab district (NEW number plates)
 
 

-
!colspan="3" align=left
replaced by 

-
!colspan="3" align=left
 

 605

-
!colspan="3" align=left
continues as 605 to Rozvadov and Přimda
-
}}
}}

Bundesstraße 14 (abbr. B14) is a German federal road. It connects Stockach in Baden-Württemberg with Rozvadov in the Czech Republic. The biggest towns along this road are Stuttgart and Nuremberg.

Wide parts of today's Bundesstraße 14 date back to medieval or even older trade routes. The stretch from Nuremberg to Prague was once known als Goldene Straße'' (″Golden Road″)

See also 
List of federal highways in Germany

References 

014